6I or 6-I can refer to:

IATA code for International Business Air
Sixth & I Historic Synagogue
AH-6I, a model of Boeing AH-6

See also
I6 (disambiguation)